Worcester Area Sports Car Club, Inc. (WASCC) was an automobile club formed after World War II by owners of foreign-built sports cars supporting rallying and autocross held in and around Worcester, Massachusetts.

Worcester Area Sports Car Club first rallied together in 1954 with 15 members and incorporated as a nonprofit in the late 1950s.  Early members included Cameron Dewar (motorsports writer for the Boston Herald) and Sante Graziani (dean of the School of the Worcester Art Museum).   The WASCC was active through the 1980s.

Further reading
 Laplante, John Guy. "Fun at a Picnic Rally: Ever hear of one?" Worcester Sunday Telegram, August 24, 1958. Feature Parade Section, p. 16.

References

External links 
 Sports Car Club of America, Inc. (SCCA)
 New England Region SCCA
 The Vintage Sports Car Club of America, Inc. (VSCCA)
 City of Worcester, Massachusetts
 Worcester Telegram & Gazette Corp.

Sports car racing
Sports Car Club of America
Auto racing organizations in the United States
Culture of Worcester, Massachusetts
Sports in Worcester, Massachusetts
1954 establishments in Massachusetts
Sports organizations established in 1954